The 2003 Wakefield Metropolitan District Council election took place on 1 May 2003 to elect members of Wakefield Metropolitan District Council in West Yorkshire, England. One third of the council was up for election and the Labour party kept overall control of the council.

After the election, the composition of the council was
Labour 50
Conservative 7
Liberal Democrat 3
Independent 3

Election result
The results saw Labour lose 2 seats to the Conservatives in Pontefract South and Wakefield Rural, and 1 seat to the Liberal Democrats in Ossett. Labour remained firmly in control, and while they were disappointed to lose 3 seats, the results were seen as being "not too bad" by the Labour council leader Peter Box. No other party won any seats, but the votes for the British National Party concerned the other political leaders. Voter turnout was lowest in South Elmsall ward at 18.6%.

Ward results

References

2003 English local elections
2003
2000s in West Yorkshire